Elections to Strathclyde Regional Council were held on Thursday 3 May 1990, on the same day as the eight other Scottish regional elections. This was the fifth election to the regional council following the local government reforms in the 1970s.

The election was the last to use the 103 electoral divisions created by the Initial Reviews of Electoral Arrangements in 1978. Each electoral division elected one councillor using first-past-the-post voting.

Labour, who had won every previous election to Strathclyde Regional Council, retained a large majority by winning 90 of the 103 seats – up three from the previous election in 1986 despite their vote share falling by 0.4%. The Conservatives remained as the second largest party by retaining five of their six seats. The Liberal Democrats contested their first election in Strathclyde following the merger of the Liberal Party and the Social Democratic Party (SDP) in 1988. The new party won four of the five seats that the Liberal Party had won in the 1986 election but with less than half vote share of its predecessors. The Liberal Party and the SDP had contested the previous election in a political alliance. Despite coming second in the popular vote and increasing their vote share to more than 20%, the Scottish National Party (SNP) retained only one of their two seats. The remaining three seats were won by independent candidates.

Results

Source:

Electoral division results

Kilmarnock North

Kilmarnock South

Stewarton and Irvine Valley

Cumnock

New Cumnock and Doon Valley

References

1990 Scottish local elections
1990